Honton is an arrondissement in the Kouffo department of Benin. It is an administrative division under the jurisdiction of the commune of Dogbo-Tota. According to the population census conducted by the Institut National de la Statistique Benin on February 15, 2002, the arrondissement had a total population of 5,814.

References

Populated places in the Kouffo Department
Arrondissements of Benin